Tin Wah Estate is a public housing estate in Tin Shui Wai, New Territories, Hong Kong, near Tin Chung Court, Tin Fu Court, Tin Yan Estate and Light Rail Chung Fu stop. It consists of seven residential buildings completed in 1999.

Houses

Demographics
According to the 2016 by-census, Tin Wah Estate had a population of 12,366. The median age was 37.2 and the majority of residents (97.8 per cent) were of Chinese ethnicity. The average household size was 3.4 people. The median monthly household income of all households (i.e. including both economically active and inactive households) was HK$26,400.

Politics
For the 2019 District Council election, the estate fell within two constituencies. Most of the estate is located in the Chung Wah constituency, which was formerly represented by Chan Sze-nga until October 2021, while Wah Sui House and Wah Yau House falls within the Shui Wah constituency, which was formerly represented by Lam Chun until July 2021.

See also

Public housing estates in Tin Shui Wai

References

Tin Shui Wai
Public housing estates in Hong Kong
Residential buildings completed in 1999